Dragon Ball Z: Budokai Tenkaichi (released in Japan as ) is a series of fighting games developed by Spike based on the Dragon Ball manga series by Akira Toriyama. The series was published by Namco Bandai Games under the Bandai brand name in Japan and Europe, and as Atari in North America and Australia from 2005 to 2007. Atari's PAL distribution network was absorbed into Bandai Namco Partners and Bandai Namco has also handled publishing in North America for future Dragon Ball Z games since 2010, effectively ending Atari's involvement.

The original game was released as a  PlayStation 2 exclusive in 2005, with the second and third installments also released for the Wii in 2006 and 2007 respectively, and Tenkaichi Tag Team released on PlayStation Portable in 2010. In March 2023, the next main entry in the series was announced by Bandai Namco and Toei Animation during the Dragon Ball Games Battle Hour 2023 event.

Origin of name 
 
The "Sparking!" in the Japanese title references the last lyric found in the chorus of the first opening theme to the Dragon Ball Z anime series, "Cha-La Head-Cha-La" ) though the opening theme to the first game is the TV series' second opening, "We Gotta Power"). Despite the localized title, the series is not a continuation of the Dragon Ball Z: Budokai series. Its been speculated that Atari chose to market the games as part of the Budokai series in order to capitalize on its success.

While Sparking! features actual music from the Dragon Ball Z anime series (as well as the Dragon Ball and Dragon Ball GT anime) as composed by Shunsuke Kikuchi, the American release of the first game features recycled music from the Budokai series (composed in Japan by Kenji Yamamoto).

Gameplay
 

The games use a "behind-the-back" third-person camera perspective. Similar to the Super Famicom-released Dragon Ball Z: Legendary Super Warriors, special forms are treated as their own character, with varying stats, movesets and fighting styles.

In battle, players can build up their Ki gauge to execute various techniques such as the Power Guard, which reduces the damage characters take by 1/4. The Ki gauge can also be used to use moves referred to as Blast 2 skills. Every character has a unique set of Blast 2 skills that allow the character to use special moves such as Ki blasts and physical attacks. Characters also have a self-recharging numeric gauge called Blast Stock that allows players to use techniques called Blast 1 skills. Blast 1 skills usually have a supportive effect such as allowing characters to regain health or immobilize the enemy. Players can also power up into a mode called Max Power Mode normally by building up their Ki beyond full at the cost of Blast Stock bars. Max Power Mode makes the character that initiated it faster, stronger, and able to use moves that are exclusive to the mode. One of these moves is the Ultimate Blast which is usually the most powerful move a character has, though use of any Blast 2 skill or the Ultimate Blast immediately ends Max Power Mode.

Game modes
In the series' story mode, (called "Z Battle Gate", "Dragon Adventure", and "Dragon History" in each console installment, respectively), the objective is to complete in battles based on moments from the original manga series, as well as anime-exclusive storylines (as seen in Dragon Ball GT, and several Dragon Ball Z films). The Dragon Balls can be acquired through story mode by destroying the environment in battle; however, the player can only keep the Dragon Ball they find if the battle is won. Each installment features several "what-if" battles and scenarios; for example, the Tenkaichi 1 story mode features modes where the player takes control of a villain and uses the character to defeat the hero, while the Tenkaichi 2 story mode has modes where Raditz and Zarbon essentially team up with the Z Fighters for one reason or another. Several levels of the Tenkaichi 2 story mode also feature cutscenes shown either before or after the fight of the level takes place. The Tenkaichi 3 story mode has cutscenes integrated into the battles themselves that are activated by hitting a certain button. These can be transformations, character changes, automatic attack use, or something as simple as a conversation.

The player can enter a World Tournament and try to win their way to the top. There are three levels of the basic tournament and a Cell Games mode. Since characters can fly, characters can leave the perimeter of the arena, but will be called for ringout if they touch the ground. There are no restrictions apart from the fact that the last match of the Cell Games mode is always against Perfect Cell. In Tenkaichi 1 winning the tournaments gave players a Z-Item prize while in Tenkaichi 2, players would receive money which in turn would be used on Z-Items. The World Tournament mode could be played with several entrants, but if there is more than one human player, no prize would be awarded. Other features in the game includes more combo attacks or character specific combos, the Blast Combos, and the Z Burst Dash. The additional combo attacks will be able to help chain in more attacks for more damage and longer combos. The Blast Combo is the normal combos however by inputting another button into the attack will allow the player to use a blast attack for extra damage. Depending on the moves of the character, the player might not be able to use this feat such as Videl  or Hercule . The Z Burst Dash is much faster and more evasive version of the Dragon Dash. It allows the user to get behind the opponent at high speeds for either a strike or to avoid a blast 2 attack. The drawback to this technique is that it will rapidly drain the player of energy. The player can fuse characters to make a better character but some characters can not be fused. The player also has the opportunity to upgrade characters.

Titles

Main series

Dragon Ball Z: Budokai Tenkaichi (2005)

The game features 64 playable characters and 10 stages. Players can fight across the Earth Wasteland, the Earth Rock Area, Planet Namek, the Islands, the City Ruins, the Hyperbolic Time Chamber, the Cell Games Arena, the Mountain Road, the World Tournament Arena, and Kami's Lookout.

Dragon Ball Z: Budokai Tenkaichi 2 (2006)

It was released for PlayStation 2 in Japan on October 5, 2006; Europe on November 3, 2006; North America on November 7, 2006; and Australia on November 9, 2006. The Wii version was released in North America on November 19, 2006; in Japan on January 1, 2007; in Europe on March 30, 2007; and Australia on April 5, 2007.

Though originally confirmed as being a launch title in North America for the Wii, some stores started selling the Wii version on November 15, 2006. An issue of V Jump listed January 2007 as the release date for the Japanese version of the Wii release. The game originally featured 100 characters in 136 forms and 16 stages, though the Japanese and PAL Wii versions came with five additional characters (Demon King Piccolo, Cyborg Tao, Appule, Frieza Soldier, and Pilaf Robot/combined form).

Dragon Ball Z: Budokai Tenkaichi 3 (2007)

The game was released for PlayStation 2 and Wii in Japan on October 4, 2007, in North America on November 13, 2007 and in Europe on November 9, 2007 for the PlayStation 2 (the Wii version was released in Japan on October 4, 2007, in North America on December 3, 2007, in Europe and Australasia on February 15, 2008).

Tenkaichi 3 features 98 characters in 161 forms, the largest roster in a fighting game at the time. Ryo Mito once stated that the game would feature never-before-seen characters made exclusively for the game.

Several new notable features include Battle Replay, which allows players to record fights and save them to an SD card; Night and day stages, which allows certain characters ability to transform; and the Wii version featured online multiplayer capability, the first game in the series to have such a feature. Players can fight against anyone from around the globe with a ranking system showing the player's current standing compared to anyone else who has played online. The PlayStation 2 version features the "Disc Fusion System", where inserting a Tenkaichi 1 or Tenkaichi 2 disc unlocks the "Ultimate Battle" or "Ultimate Battle Z" modes, featured in the respective games needed to unlock them. The game also supports 480p for both the Wii and the PlayStation 2 versions.

Other features include more combo attacks or character specific combos, Blast Combos, and the Z Burst Dash. The additional combo attacks will be able to help chain in more attacks for more damage and longer combos. The Blast Combos are normal combos used in the game, however by inputting another button into the attack will allow the player to use a blast attack for extra damage. Depending on the moves of the character the player might not be able to use this feat such as Videl or Hercule. The Z Burst Dash is a much faster and more evasive version of the Dragon Dash. It allows the user to get behind the opponent at high speeds for either a strike or to avoid a blast 2 attack. The drawback to this technique is that it will rapidly drain the player of energy. Also to charge up all their energy, the player must have one blast one stock filled up to power up to the very limit.

Untitled Dragon Ball Z: Budokai Tenkaichi sequel (TBA)
During the Dragon Ball Games Battle Hour event in March 2023, the next main entry in the Budokai Tenkaichi game series was announced through a teaser trailer. It is expected to release on current-gen consoles, and will feature returning playable characters,  forms and stages (Planet Namek amongst several others), as well as possibly missing obscure characters and newcomers from Dragon Ball Super, with Goku confirmed to be able to transform into his Super Saiyan Blue form. The game is reportedly being developed under the working title Dragon Ball: SPARKING! ZERO.

Other games

Dragon Ball Z: Tenkaichi Tag Team (2010)
Tenkaichi Tag Team was originally the last traditional game in the Budokai Tenkaichi series to retain its native gameplay, and the only installment to be released on a handheld console. The game was published by Bandai Namco and released in August 2010 for PlayStation Portable.

As the title suggests, the game focuses on two on two fights. "Dragon Walker" is the main story mode, following the events of the manga and anime series. Other modes include "Battle 100", where the player fights many teams; and "Free Battle", where the player can fight any team of their choice. Other features include the ability to perform fusions, and upgrade characters using "D-POINTS", the game's main currency.

Characters

Reception

Budokai Tenkaichi

Budokai Tenkaichi received "average" reviews according to the review aggregation website Metacritic.

Budokai Tenkaichi 2 

Budokai Tenkaichi 2 received "average" reviews on both platforms according to Metacritic. The PS2 version of the game received the 'Best Fighting Game of the Year' award from X-Play. Mark Bozon of IGN said of the controls, "The sheer speed and complexity of the controls may turn some people off, but the general combat will eventually come down to two buttons, making the game amazingly easy to learn, but nearly impossible to fully master." Nintendo Power gave the Wii version a score of 10 for "Dragon Ball Z fans", and 5.5 for "everyone else", rounding out the overall score to 7.5 out of 10.

Budokai Tenkaichi 3 

Budokai Tenkaichi 3 received "average" reviews on both platforms according to Metacritic. Japanese videogame magazine Famitsu gave the PS2 version a score of 32 out of 40, while the Wii version received 33 out of 40. IGN awarded both versions of Tenkaichi 3 positively, with their only complaints being the comparatively underwhelming story mode (in comparison to Tenkaichi 2), gimmicky Disc Fusion, and the lagging Wi-Fi.

Tenkaichi Tag Team 
It has a score of 63% on Metacritic. GameSpot awarded it a score of 6.0 out of 10, saying "Dragon Ball Z: Tenkaichi Tag Team is just another DBZ fighting game, and makes little effort to distinguish itself from its predecessors."

Notes

References

External links 

 Official Budokai Tenkaichi series website 
 Dragon Ball Z: Budokai Tenkaichi at Bandai Namco  
 Dragon Ball Z: Budokai Tenkaichi 2 at Bandai Namco  
 Dragon Ball Z: Budokai Tenkaichi 3 at Bandai Namco  
 Dragon Ball Z: Tenkaichi Tag Team at Bandai Namco  
 
 
 
 

2005 video games
2006 video games
2007 video games
Atari games
Fighting games
3D fighting games
Bandai games
Bandai Namco games
Budokai Tenkaichi
Nintendo Wi-Fi Connection games
PlayStation 2 games
PlayStation Portable games
Shueisha franchises
Spike (company) games
Video game franchises
Video games developed in Japan
Video games with cel-shaded animation
Wii games
Wii Wi-Fi games
Video games with AI-versus-AI modes